The 1988 United States presidential election in Louisiana took place on November 8, 1988, as part of the 1988 United States presidential election. State voters chose ten representatives, or electors to the Electoral College, who voted for president and vice president.

Louisiana strongly voted for the Republican nominee, Vice President George H. W. Bush, over the Democratic nominee, Massachusetts governor Michael Dukakis. The margin was 10%, which was nonetheless the best showing for Dukakis in a former Confederate state. This result made Louisiana 2.4% more Republican than the nation-at-large. , this is the last election in which Tensas Parish voted for a Republican presidential candidate.

Results

Results by parish

See also
 United States presidential elections in Louisiana
 Presidency of George H. W. Bush

References

Louisiana
1988
1988 Louisiana elections